Droga krajowa nr 85 (translates from Polish as national road 85) is route belonging to Polish national roads network. It runs through Masovian Voivodeships, leading from crossing with national road 62 in Nowy Dwór Mazowiecki to junction with expressway S7 near Kazuń Polski. With its entire length, national road 85 was the shortest of all Polish national roads until 1 January 2014 (now the shortest is national road 96).

Major towns along the route 
 Nowy Dwór Mazowiecki (national road 62)
 Kazuń (S7)

Route plan 

85